Zsolt Posza (born 11 May 1977 in Hungary) is a Hungarian football player. He last played in Cyprus for Doxa Katokopia as a goalkeeper. Who currently plays for Kaposvári Rákóczi FC.

External links

Olympiakos beats Ergotelis 1-0, retains league lead.

1977 births
Living people
People from Lengyeltóti
Hungarian footballers
Association football goalkeepers
Hungary international footballers
Hungary under-21 international footballers
BFC Siófok players
Győri ETO FC players
Újpest FC players
Vasas SC players
Ergotelis F.C. players
Doxa Katokopias FC players
Kaposvári Rákóczi FC players
Nemzeti Bajnokság I players
Super League Greece players
Cypriot First Division players
Hungarian expatriate footballers
Expatriate footballers in Greece
Expatriate footballers in Cyprus
Hungarian expatriate sportspeople in Greece
Hungarian expatriate sportspeople in Cyprus
Sportspeople from Somogy County